Élise Fischer (13 July 1948 in Champigneulles, Meurthe-et-Moselle) is a French writer, journalist and novelist from  Lorraine.

Biography 
Élise Fischer is the daughter of a father from Lorrain and a mother from Alsace.

She has been working with the Bayard Presse group since 1992. Among her novels, several essays are devoted to children's rights. In 2007 she returned to Lorraine and settled there.

Works 
1988: Les Enfants de l'apartheid, Fayard
1989: Feu sur l'enfance, Fayard
1998: La Colère de Mouche, Éditions Mazarine
2000: L'Inaccomplie, Mazarine  
2000: Les pommes seront fameuses cette année, Mazarine
2001: Trois reines pour une couronne, Presses de la Cité
2002: Le Dernier Amour d'Auguste, Fayard
2003: Les Alliances de cristal, Presses de la Cité
2003: Un petit carré de soie, Fayard
2004: Mystérieuse Manon, Presses de la Cité
2005: Nous, les derniers mineurs : l'épopée des Gueules noires, hors collection (in collaboration with Camille Oster)
2005: Le Soleil des mineurs, Presses de la Cité
2006: L'Enfant perdu des Philippines, Collection Sud Lointain, Presses de la Cité
2006: Les cigognes savaient, Presses de la Cité
2007: Appelez-moi Jeanne, Fayard
2007: Le Roman de la Place Stanislas, Place Stanislas Éditions
2008: La Lorraine au cœur. Promenade à travers l'histoire et les paysages, Place Stanislas Éditions
2008: Confession d'Adrien le colporteur, Presses de la Cité
2008: Un rire d’ailleurs, Fayard
2009: Quand je serai grand, Fayard
2009: Le Secret du Pressoir, Presses de la Cité
2010: Sous les mirabelliers, Presses de la Cité
2010: Les Noces de Marie-Victoire, Calmann-Lévy
2010: Le Rêve de la Grenouille, Presses de la Cité
2011: Les Larmes et l'espoir with Geneviève Senger, Presses de la Cité
2012: Les Amours de la Grenouille, Presses de la cité
2013: '$$$'Au péril de la vérité, Presses de la Cité
2013: Je jouerai encore pour nous, Calmann-Lévy
2014: La Tante de Russie, Presses de la Cité
2014: Villa Sourire, Calmann-Lévy
2015: L’Étrange Destin de Marie, Calmann-Lévy
2016: Le Jardin de Pétronille, Calmann-Lévy
2016: Sur le Fil, Presses de la Cité

 Books for youth 
2008: Meurtre au Village du Livre, l'Oxalide.
2012: Madeleine et le dessert du roi Stanislas, illustration Amélie Dufour, Feuilles de menthe, collection Le thé aux histoires
2013: Si la bergamote m'était contée : le bonbon soleil, illustrations Jude Leppo, Le Verger des Hespérides

 In collaboration 
1991: Pour les enfants du monde, collective work under the direction of professor Alexandre Minkowski, Éditions n°1/UNICEF/MPLEM
2003: L'Appel de Lunéville : Pour la Résurrection du Versailles lorrain, collective work under the direction of François Moulin and Michel Vagner, éditions de l'Est Républicain/La Nuée Bleue
2007: Paroles d'auteurs – La Lorraine – Photographs Pascal Bodez, collective work with the support of Conseil Régional de Lorraine, Serge Domini, éditeur
2009: Les plus belles Saint-Nicolas en Lorraine, under the direction of Marie-Hélène Colin, Place Stanislas éditions
2009: Les plus beaux Noëls d'Alsace, under the direction of Michel Loetscher, Place Stanislas éditions
2010: Si Champigneulles m'était conté, parwork directed by an 11th-grade scholl of Champigneulles, Le Verger des Hespérides éditions

Distinctions
2001: Feuille d'or de la ville de Nancy for L'Inaccomplie2004: Prix de l'Association Le printemps du Livre lorrain for Mystérieuse Manon2005: Prix des Conseillers généraux de la région lorraine for Le soleil des Mineurs2005: Prix Victor Hugo pour Le soleil des Mineurs2007: Mention spéciale du prix des Écrivains Croyants for Appelez-moi Jeanne2010: Prix Prouvé de Nancy for Quand je serai grand Bibliography 
Michel Caffier, Dictionnaire des littératures de Lorraine'', Serpenoise, 2003,

External links 

 Élise Fischer on Babelio
 Élise Fischer on Calmann-Lévy
 Notice on the site ÉcriVosges
 Élise Fischer on Imaginales
 Interview. Élise Fischer, L’Étrange destin de Marie on L'internaute
 Élise Fischer on Presses de la Cité
 Élise Fischer on Ricochet-Jeunes

20th-century French journalists
21st-century French writers
French women journalists
1948 births
People from Meurthe-et-Moselle
Living people
21st-century French women writers
20th-century French women